The women's football tournament at the 2014 Asian Games was held in Incheon and three other cities in South Korea from September 14 to October 1, 2014. The opening match was played 5 days prior to the opening ceremony. In this tournament, 11 teams participated in women's competition.

North Korea won the gold medal after defeating the title holder; Japan in the final with 3–1 score. The bronze medal was won by the host, South Korea after defeating Vietnam 3–0.

Squads

Results
All times are Korea Standard Time (UTC+09:00)

First round

Group A

Group B

Group C

Third-placed teams

Knockout round

Quarterfinals

Semifinals

Bronze medal match

Gold medal match

Goalscorers

Final standing

References

External links
Official website

Women